Desert Funk Soundtrack (stylized as M.C. Magic Presents Desert Funk! Soundtrack) is a studio album project produced by rapper M.C. Magic, on the independent label Nastyboy Records.
 
After releasing his first album Don't Worry in 1995, Marcus Cardenas found a hip-hop band called Nastyboy Klick, whose first album The First Chapter had attracted the attention of local radio stations, producing a number regional hits (particularly the single "Down for Yours" featuring Roger Troutman). Before recording the second Nastyboy Klick's album, Cardenas recruited several Phoenix-based artists to present him a so-called Desert Funk! Soundtrack compilation.

The album had thirteen tracks recorded with such artists as True Breed, Black Insane, Nastyboy Klick, CeCe Peniston, P.O.W. and Mandi. The song "I Know You Want Me" was released as a single, reaching number nine on the U.S. Billboard Bubbling Under Hot 100 R&B Singles in 1998.

Track listing

Robert Montaño-composer and producer of “Summertime” by P.O.W is still waiting for a publishing statement and or check 
 Marcus Cardenas - record producer
 True Breed - performer
 Black Insane - performer
 Nastyboy Klick - performer
 CeCe Peniston - performer
 P.O.W. - performer
 Markal - performer
 Sly - performer
 Mandi - performer
 2 Faced - performer

Charts

Radio singles

References 

General

Specific

External links
 
 

1998 albums
MC Magic albums
CeCe Peniston albums